The 1920 Liège–Bastogne–Liège was the tenth edition of the Liège–Bastogne–Liège cycle race and was held on 6 June 1920. The race started and finished in Liège. The race was won by Léon Scieur.

General classification

References

1920
1920 in Belgian sport